Vilardevós is a municipality in the Spanish province of Ourense. It has a population of 2024 (2014) and an area of 152 km².

References  

Municipalities in the Province of Ourense